Paquet Bay is an Arctic waterway in Qikiqtaaluk Region, Nunavut, Canada. Located at Baffin Island's Borden Peninsula, Paquet Bay is situated between Tay Sound and Oliver Sound.  Frechette Island is located at its mouth.

Bays of Baffin Island
Bays of Qikiqtaaluk Region